Matheus Caldeira Vidotto de Oliveira (born 10 April 1993) is a Brazilian footballer who currently plays for Tokyo Verdy.

Career

Early life
Matheus began playing for Corinthians' academy at the age of eleven and had a very successful campaign. He won the 2012 Copa São Paulo de Futebol Júnior. He also had to deal with three surgeries due to Wolff–Parkinson–White syndrome.

Corinthians
Matheus was moved to the first team in 2012, but only made his professional debut on 22 July 2015, as he entered in the second half of Corinthians' 1–0 victory against ABC at Frasqueirão stadium in Natal. His official debut took place on 24 February 2016 as he started in a 2016 Campeonato Paulista match against São Bento.

Figuirense
Matheus joined to Figuirense for 2019 season. He left the club in 2019 after a season at Figuirense.

Tokyo Verdy
On 15 January 2020, Matheus abroad to Japan and announcement officially transfer to J2 club, Tokyo Verdy for ahead of 2020 season. Although he was late in the early part of the season due to a breakdown, he contributed to the buildup with his good foot skills and grabbed a position in the 4th round. As a result, he played in 37 games this year.

International career
He has been capped at Under-20 level for Brazil and was part of the squad for the 2013 South American Youth Football Championship. He was also part of the Brazil U23 squad in 2016.

In April 2013, Matheus was called up by Luiz Felipe Scolari for a friendly against Bolivia, despite never playing professionally before. He was an unused substitute.

Career statistics

Honours
Corinthians
Campeonato Brasileiro Série A: 2015, 2017

References

External links

1993 births
Living people
Brazilian footballers
Brazilian expatriate footballers
Sport Club Corinthians Paulista players
Association football goalkeepers
J2 League players
Figueirense FC players
Tokyo Verdy players
Expatriate footballers in Japan
Footballers from São Paulo